Sandra K. Ellston, also published under the pen names Sandra K. Fischer and Sandra Mason  (née Klein; June 18, 1950 in Salem, Oregon) is an American Shakespearean scholar and professor of English and writing at Eastern Oregon University, where she also served as Dean of the College of Arts and Sciences and where she was recipient of the Woman of Vision and Courage Award.

Biography
She received a Ph.D. from the University of Oregon in 1980.  After that, she was a professor at the State University of New York at Albany, where she received both the President's and the Chancellor's Awards for Excellence in Teaching and was Chair of Undergraduate Studies in English and co-director of the Humanities Center. She has conducted research at the Folger Shakespeare Library and received an American Council of Learned Societies grant to participate in the World Shakespeare Conference in Berlin.  She specializes in studies of metaphor, particularly metaphors of value and coinage, and is author of Econolingua (1985). Her articles on Renaissance dramatist Elizabeth Cary and on the character Ophelia in Hamlet are widely reprinted.  As a Research Fellow at the Oregon State University Center for the Humanities, she applied metaphors of value and valuation to Shakespeare's history plays.  Her scholarly articles appear in various learned journals.

She has spent the last decade as a creative writer of poetry, fiction, creative non-fiction, and drama. Her works appear in various literary magazines, and she was a recipient of the Oregon Literary Arts fellowship award in drama. She is founder and organizer of the Northwest Poets' Concord.

Bibliography

Books 
As Sandra K. Fischer:
  
 Reviewed in 
 Reviewed in Shakespeare Quarterly 38 (1987): 117-19.
 Reviewed in The Shakespeare Newsletter 37.1.193 (Spring 1987): 4.
 Reviewed in Cahiers Elisabethains 30 (1986): 132.
Reviewed in Theatre Survey 28 (1987): 75-77.

Creative writing
 Ambassador, Oregon State Poetry Association, 2007–present.
 Member, Academy of American Poets, 2003.
 “Small Steps” (poem), web published by Poets for Peace, www.iqpoetry.com, March 7, 2003.
 “Surfsound” (poem), hipfish, July 2003.
 “Bear’s Saga, or Revolution” (poem), The Cascade Reader, June 2003.
 “Heritage Tree,” featured poem in Sunday Oregonian, January 14, 2007.
 “Postmodern Erotics” and “Earthwork” (poems) in The Pregnant Moon Review, 2008.
 “Patients First” (creative non-fiction), The Propell Group Anthology, 2008.
 “Primrose” and “The Garden” in Thresholds, November 2008.
 “Fort Clatsop.” “Climbing Mt. Angel,” “Hillwriting: Grande Ronde Valley” (poems), and “Pickin’” (story) in Oregon150 (web), December 2008.
 “A Prayer for Ellen,” 13th Moon, volume 21 (2009).

Journal articles

Excerpted and reprinted in 
Excerpted and reprinted in 
 Excerpted and reprinted in 
 
Reprinted in 
Reprinted in 
 (Selected for special "Portrait of a Lady" issue.)

Essays in collections
 

 
 
 

 Excerpted in

Performance
 Featured poet at Oregon Writers’ Colony ceremony, Looking Glass Bookstore, Oct. 27, 2008, Portland, OR
 Featured poet at 3d Anniversary Celebration of the Spoken Word sponsored by hipfish, Astoria River Theater, January 13, 2003
 Staged reading of excerpts from my play, The Last Kalapooyan, Pierce Library, EOU, April 16, 2002
 Dramaturge, As You Like It, SUNYA, 1993-94 (commended for excellence by the Kennedy Center/American College Theatre Festival)
 Staged reading of Renaissance by David Bookbinder, Borders, Feb. 13, 1994
 Gertrude and Ophelia in Tom Stoppard's Fifteen-Minute Hamlet, 1990

References

External links

Living people
1950 births
Writers from Salem, Oregon
American women writers
Eastern Oregon University faculty
University of Oregon alumni
University at Albany, SUNY faculty
American women academics
21st-century American women